Graeme Brooke (born 6 October 1963 in Melbourne) is an Australian professional light/light welterweight boxer of the 1980s who won the Australian lightweight title, and Commonwealth lightweight title, and was a challenger for the Commonwealth lightweight title against Langton Tinago, his professional fighting weight varied from , i.e. lightweight to , i.e. light welterweight.

References

External links

Image - Graeme Brooke

1963 births
Lightweight boxers
Light-welterweight boxers
Boxers from Melbourne
Living people
Australian male boxers
Commonwealth Boxing Council champions